Pogorzela  is a village in the administrative district of Gmina Olszanka, within Brzeg County, Opole Voivodeship, in southern Poland.

History
Pogorzela was the ancestral seat of the Pogorzelski family of Grzymała coat of arms. In 1333, Duke Bolesław III the Generous from the Piast dynasty granted the village to Przecław of Pogorzela and his brother. In 1344, Bishop Przecław granted various benefits from the village to the monastery in Kamieniec Ząbkowicki.

Notable people
Przecław of Pogorzela (1310–1376), Bishop of Wrocław

References

Pogorzela